Louis "Sweet Lou" Dunbar (born August 8, 1953) is the Director of Player Personnel, a coach, and a former 27-year veteran basketball player for the Harlem Globetrotters.

High school
Dunbar, who was born in Minden, the seat of Webster Parish in northwestern Louisiana, on August 8, 1953, attended the former African American Webster High School (since consolidated into Minden High School), where he played high school basketball. Dunbar's father, Louis Dunbar Sr., was a deputy for Sheriff O.H. Haynes Jr., who was the father of the Minden football star Fred Haynes, who later became the starting quarterback of the LSU Tigers.

He won a high school state championship in his senior year of high school, and was named the Louisiana Mr. Basketball.

College career
Dunbar played college basketball at the University of Houston, with the Houston Cougars, from 1972 to 1975. He averaged 22.3 points, 7.7 rebounds, and 4.1 assists per game during his college career.

Professional career
Dunbar was selected in the 4th round, with the 59th overall pick of the 1975 NBA Draft, by the Philadelphia 76ers. However, he never played in the NBA. Instead, he played professional basketball in Switzerland, with SP Federale. With Federale, he won the Swiss League championship in 1976. He also played with SP Federale in the EuroLeague, during the 1975–76 season.

After ending his pro club career in 1977, Dunbar joined the Harlem Globetrotters.

Coaching career
Dunbar served as a boys’ basketball coach in the Houston area, and also conducted private basketball lessons. He has also coached at the First Presbyterian School.

Personal life
Dunbar is a member of "Legends of Basketball", the National Basketball Retired Players Association.
He was inducted into the University of Houston Hall of Honor on November 15, 2008.

References

External links

"Sweet" Lou Dunbar via Globetrotters site

1953 births
Living people
African-American basketball coaches
African-American basketball players
American men's basketball coaches
American men's basketball players
Basketball coaches from Louisiana
Basketball players from Louisiana
Centers (basketball)
Harlem Globetrotters coaches
Harlem Globetrotters players
Houston Cougars men's basketball players
Philadelphia 76ers draft picks
Point guards
Power forwards (basketball)
Shooting guards
Small forwards
SP Federale Lugano players
Sportspeople from Minden, Louisiana
21st-century African-American people
20th-century African-American sportspeople